Troise is a surname. Notable people with the surname include:

 Ciccio Troise, Italian footballer and coach
 Emanuele Troise (born 1979), Italian footballer and coach
 Pablo Troise (born 1936), Uruguayan lawyer and judge